Johannes Petrus "Duimpie" Theron  (born 7 May 1979) is a South African-born rugby union player who played for the Namibia national rugby union team and represented Namibia during the 1999 Rugby World Cup.

Playing career
His debut was in 1998, as a nineteen-year-old, in the Rugby World Cup qualifier against  in Casablanca. Theron played in three matches during the pool stages at the 1999 Rugby World Cup. Shortly after the World Cup, he also played in a test match against , after which his next and final test was only five years later in 2004, against .

Test history

References

1979 births
Living people
Namibia international rugby union players
Blue Bulls players
Griquas (rugby union) players
Western Province (rugby union) players
Rugby union locks